Seán Clancy (7 July 1901 – 17 September 2006) was a veteran of Ireland's War of Independence. Clancy served in the war as a member of Irish Republican Army, and later as a commander of the Fifth Infantry Battalion in the Irish Defence Forces.  He was a Lieutenant-Colonel at the time of his death.

Personal life
He grew up on a farm in the parish of Bridgetown in East Clare. He married Agnes Creagh, from Castlebar, in 1926, and they had five children.

Politics
Clancy was a prominent participant in the Dublin Castle ceremony in which Britain handed power to the new Irish government.

Clancy was a Fine Gael supporter throughout his life, he received visits from Liam Cosgrave, John Bruton and Enda Kenny.

He died 17 September 2006, aged 105, after a short illness, at St Vincent's Hospital, Dublin. He is buried in Deans Grange Cemetery.

References

1901 births
2006 deaths
Irish Army officers
Irish centenarians
Men centenarians
People from County Clare